Helena Bonham Carter  (born 26 May 1966) is an English actress. Known for her roles in blockbusters and independent films, particularly period dramas, she has received various awards and nominations, including a British Academy Film Award and an International Emmy Award, in addition to nominations for two Academy Awards, four British Academy Television Awards, five Primetime Emmy Awards, and nine Golden Globe Awards.

Bonham Carter rose to prominence by playing Lucy Honeychurch in A Room with a View (1985) and the title character in Lady Jane (1986). Her early period roles saw her typecast as a virginal "English rose", a label with which she was uncomfortable. She is best known for her eccentric fashion and dark aesthetic and for often playing quirky women. For her role as Kate Croy in The Wings of the Dove (1997), Bonham Carter received a nomination for the Academy Award for Best Actress, and for her portrayal of Queen Elizabeth The Queen Mother in The King's Speech (2010), she won the BAFTA Award for Best Actress in a Supporting Role, and was nominated for the Academy Award for Best Supporting Actress. Her other films include Hamlet (1990), Howards End (1992), Mary Shelley's Frankenstein (1994), Mighty Aphrodite (1995), Fight Club (1999), Wallace & Gromit: The Curse of the Were-Rabbit (2005), the Harry Potter series (2007–2011) as Bellatrix Lestrange, Great Expectations (2012) as Miss Havisham, Les Misérables (2012), Cinderella (2015), Ocean's 8 (2018), and Enola Holmes (2020). Her collaborations with director Tim Burton, her former domestic partner, include Big Fish (2003), Corpse Bride (2005), Charlie and the Chocolate Factory (2005), Sweeney Todd: The Demon Barber of Fleet Street (2007) as Mrs. Lovett, Alice in Wonderland (2010) as the Red Queen, and Dark Shadows (2012).

For her role as children's author Enid Blyton in the BBC Four biographical film Enid (2009), she won the 2010 International Emmy Award for Best Actress and was nominated for the British Academy Television Award for Best Actress. Her other television films include Fatal Deception: Mrs. Lee Harvey Oswald (1993), Live from Baghdad (2002), Toast (2010), and Burton & Taylor (2013). From 2019 to 2020, she portrayed Princess Margaret in seasons three and four of Netflix's The Crown.

Early life and education
Bonham Carter was born in Islington, London. Her father, Raymond Bonham Carter, who came from a prominent British political family, was a merchant banker and served as the alternative British director representing the Bank of England at the International Monetary Fund in Washington, DC, during the 1960s. Her mother, Elena (née Propper de Callejón), is a psychotherapist who is of Spanish and mostly Jewish background, and whose parents were diplomat Eduardo Propper de Callejón from Spain and painter Baroness Hélène Fould-Springer. Bonham Carter's paternal grandmother was politician and feminist Violet Bonham Carter, daughter of H. H. Asquith, the Prime Minister of the United Kingdom during the first half of the First World War.

Bonham Carter has two older brothers; Edward and Thomas. They were brought up in Golders Green, and she was educated at South Hampstead High School, and completed her A-levels at Westminster School. Bonham Carter applied to King's College, Cambridge, but was rejected.

When Bonham Carter was five, her mother had a serious nervous breakdown, from which she needed three years to recover. Soon afterwards, her mother's experience in therapy led her to become a psychotherapist herself. Bonham Carter has since paid her to read her scripts and deliver opinions on the characters' psychological motivations. Five years after her mother's recovery, her father was diagnosed with acoustic neuroma. He suffered complications during an operation to remove the tumour, which led to a stroke, leaving him half-paralysed and using a wheelchair. With her brothers at college, Bonham Carter was left to help her mother cope. She later studied her father's movements and mannerisms for her role in The Theory of Flight. He died in January 2004.

Career

Early work and breakthrough (1980s–1990s)
Bonham Carter, who has had no formal acting training, entered the field winning a national writing contest in 1979, and used the money to pay for her entry into the actors' Spotlight directory. She made her professional acting debut at the age of 16 in a television commercial. She also had a minor part in the 1983 TV film A Pattern of Roses.

Bonham Carter's first lead film role was as Lady Jane Grey in Lady Jane (1986), which was given mixed reviews by critics. Her breakthrough role was as Lucy Honeychurch in A Room with a View (1985), an adaptation of E. M. Forster's 1908 novel, which was filmed after Lady Jane, but released two months earlier. She also appeared in episodes of Miami Vice as Don Johnson's love interest during the 1986–87 season, and then in 1987 with Dirk Bogarde in The Vision, Stewart Granger in A Hazard of Hearts, and John Gielgud in Getting It Right. Bonham Carter was originally cast for the role of Bess McNeill in Breaking the Waves, but backed out during production owing to "the character's painful psychic and physical exposure", according to Roger Ebert. The role went to Emily Watson, who was nominated for an Academy Award for her performance.

Her early films led to her being typecast as a "corset queen" and "English rose", playing pre- and early 20th century characters, particularly in Merchant Ivory films. Uncomfortable with this image, she states: "I looked, as someone said, like a bloated chipmunk". In 1994, Bonham Carter appeared in a dream sequence during the second series of the British sitcom Absolutely Fabulous, as Edina Monsoon's daughter Saffron, who was normally played by Julia Sawalha. Throughout the series, references were made to Saffron's resemblance to Bonham Carter.

Bonham Carter, who speaks French fluently, starred in a 1996 French film titled Portraits chinois. That same year, she played Olivia in Trevor Nunn's film version of Twelfth Night. One of the high points of her early career was her performance as the scheming Kate Croy in the 1997 film adaption of The Wings of the Dove, which was highly acclaimed internationally and saw her receive her first Golden Globe and Academy Award nominations. Then followed Fight Club in 1999, in which she played Marla Singer, a role for which she won the 2000 Empire Award for Best British Actress.

Worldwide recognition and blockbuster films (2000s–2020s)

In August 2001, she was featured in Maxim. She played her second Queen of England when she was cast as Anne Boleyn in the ITV1 miniseries Henry VIII; however, her role was restricted, as she was pregnant with her first child at the time of filming. In 2005, she voiced Lady Tottingham, a wealthy aristocratic spinster in the 2005 stop-motion animated comedy Wallace & Gromit: The Curse of the Were-Rabbit. Starring alongside Ralph Fiennes and Peter Sallis, the film serves as part of the Wallace and Gromit series.

She was a member of the 2006 Cannes Film Festival jury that unanimously selected The Wind That Shakes the Barley as best film. In May 2006, Bonham Carter launched her own fashion line, "The Pantaloonies", with swimwear designer Samantha Sage. Their first collection, called Bloomin' Bloomers, is a Victorian style selection of camisoles, mob caps, and bloomers. The duo worked on Pantaloonies customised jeans, which Bonham Carter describes as "a kind of scrapbook on the bum".

Bonham Carter played the evil witch Bellatrix Lestrange in the final four Harry Potter films (2007–2011). While filming Harry Potter and the Order of the Phoenix, she accidentally perforated the eardrum of Matthew Lewis (playing Neville Longbottom) when she stuck her wand into his ear canal. Bonham Carter received positive reviews as Bellatrix, described as a "shining but underused talent". She played Mrs. Lovett, Sweeney Todd's (Johnny Depp) amorous accomplice, in the film adaptation of Stephen Sondheim's Broadway musical, Sweeney Todd: The Demon Barber of Fleet Street, directed by Burton. 
Bonham Carter received a nomination for the Golden Globe for Best Actress for her performance. She won the Best Actress award in the 2007 Evening Standard British Film Awards for her performances in Sweeney Todd and Conversations With Other Women, along with another Best Actress award at the 2009 Empire Awards. Bonham Carter also appeared in the fourth Terminator film, entitled Terminator Salvation, playing a small but pivotal role as a personification of Skynet.

In 2009, Bonham Carter was the mother squirrel narrator in the 30-minute animated film adaptation of the best-selling children's book The Gruffalo, which was broadcast on BBC One on 25 December 2009. Bonham Carter joined the cast of Tim Burton's 2010 film, Alice in Wonderland, as the Red Queen. 
She appears alongside Johnny Depp, Anne Hathaway, Mia Wasikowska, Crispin Glover, and Harry Potter co-star Alan Rickman. Her role was an amalgamation of the Queen of Hearts and the Red Queen. 
In early 2009, Bonham Carter was named one of The Timess top-10 British Actresses of all time, along with fellow actresses Judi Dench, Helen Mirren, Maggie Smith, Julie Andrews, and Audrey Hepburn.

In 2010, Bonham Carter played Queen Elizabeth in the film The King's Speech. , she had received numerous plaudits and praise for her performance, including nominations for the BAFTA Award for Best Actress in a Supporting Role and the Academy Award for Best Supporting Actress. She won her first BAFTA Award, but lost the Academy Award to Melissa Leo for The Fighter.

Bonham Carter signed to play author Enid Blyton in the BBC Four television biopic, Enid. It was the first depiction of Blyton's life on the screen; she starred with Matthew Macfadyen and Denis Lawson. She received her first Television BAFTA Nomination for Best Actress, for Enid. In 2010, she starred with Freddie Highmore in the Nigel Slater biopic Toast, which was filmed in the West Midlands and received a gala at the 2011 Berlin International Film Festival. She received the Britannia Award for British Artist of the Year from BAFTA LA in 2011.

In 2012, she appeared as the eccentric, jilted bride Miss Havisham—one of the most potent figures in Victorian gothic fiction—in Mike Newell's adaptation of the Charles Dickens novel Great Expectations. In April 2012, she appeared in Rufus Wainwright's music video for his single "Out of the Game", featured on the album of the same name. She co-starred in a film adaptation of the musical Les Misérables, released in 2012. She played the role of Madame Thénardier.

On 17 May 2012, Bonham Carter was announced to be appearing in the 2013 adaptation (entitled The Young and Prodigious T.S. Spivet) of Reif Larsen's book The Selected Works of T.S. Spivet. Her casting was announced alongside that of Kathy Bates, Kyle Catlett and Callum Keith Rennie, with Jean-Pierre Jeunet directing. She also appeared in a short film directed by Roman Polanski for the clothing brand Prada. The short was entitled A Therapy and she appeared as a patient of Ben Kingsley's therapist.

In 2013, she played Red Harrington, a peg-legged brothel madam, who assists Reid and Tonto in locating Cavendish, in the movie The Lone Ranger. Also that year, Bonham Carter narrated poetry for The Love Book App, an interactive anthology of love literature developed by Allie Byrne Esiri. Also in 2013, Bonham Carter appeared as Elizabeth Taylor, alongside Dominic West as Richard Burton, in BBC4's Burton & Taylor, which premiered at the 2013 Hamptons International Film Festival. She played the Fairy Godmother in the 2015 live-action re-imagining of Walt Disney's Cinderella.

In 2016, Bonham Carter reprised her role of the Red Queen in Alice Through the Looking Glass. In June 2018, she starred in a spin-off of the Ocean's Eleven trilogy, titled Ocean's 8, alongside Sandra Bullock, Cate Blanchett, Anne Hathaway, and Sarah Paulson. She plays an older Princess Margaret—whom Bonham Carter knew in person through her uncle Mark—for the Netflix series The Crown, replacing Vanessa Kirby, who played a younger version for the first two seasons. In 2020, Bonham Carter starred as Eudoria Holmes in the Netflix film Enola Holmes, which is based on the Sherlock Holmes adaptation, The Enola Holmes Mysteries.

Personal life
In August 2008, four of Bonham Carter's relatives were killed in a safari bus crash in South Africa, and she was given indefinite leave from filming Terminator Salvation, returning later to complete filming.

In early October 2008, Bonham Carter reportedly had become a patron of the charity Action Duchenne, the national charity established to support parents and sufferers of Duchenne muscular dystrophy.

In August 2014, Bonham Carter was one of 200 public figures who were signatories to a letter to The Guardian opposing Scottish independence in the run-up to September's referendum on that issue. In 2016, Bonham Carter said she was keen on the UK remaining in the European Union in regard to the referendum on that issue.

Bonham Carter was appointed to the honorary position of the London Library’s president, making her their first female president, in 2022. She has been a member of the London Library since 1986.

Relationships
In 1994, Bonham Carter and Kenneth Branagh met while filming Mary Shelley's Frankenstein. They began an affair while Branagh was still married to Emma Thompson. At the time, Thompson's career was soaring, while Branagh was struggling to make a success of his first big-budget film (Mary Shelley's Frankenstein). Following the affair, Branagh and Thompson divorced in 1995. In 1999, after five years together, Bonham Carter and Branagh separated.

Thompson has said she has "no hard feelings" towards Bonham Carter, calling her affair with Branagh "blood under the bridge". She explained: "You can't hold on to anything like that. It's pointless. I haven't got the energy for it. Helena and I made our peace years and years ago. She's a wonderful woman". Thompson, Branagh, and Bonham Carter all later went on to appear in the Harry Potter series; Thompson and Bonham Carter both appeared in Order of the Phoenix.

In 2001, Bonham Carter began a relationship with American director Tim Burton, whom she met while filming Planet of the Apes. Burton cast her in his other films, including Big Fish, Corpse Bride, Charlie and the Chocolate Factory, Sweeney Todd: The Demon Barber of Fleet Street, Alice in Wonderland, and Dark Shadows. After their separation, Bonham Carter said, "It might be easier to work together without being together anymore. He always only cast me with great embarrassment".

Bonham Carter and Burton lived in adjoining houses in Belsize Park, London. She owned one of the houses; Burton later bought the other, and they connected the two. In 2006, they bought the Mill House in Sutton Courtenay, Oxfordshire. It was previously leased by her grandmother, Violet Bonham Carter, and owned by her great-grandfather H. H. Asquith.

Bonham Carter and Burton have a son and daughter together. She told The Daily Telegraph of her struggles with infertility and the difficulties she had during her pregnancies. She said that before the conception of her daughter, she and Burton had been trying for a baby for two years and, although they conceived naturally, they were considering in vitro fertilisation.

On 23 December 2014, the two announced that they had "separated amicably" earlier that year. Of the separation, Bonham Carter told Harper's Bazaar: "Everyone always says you have to be strong and have a stiff upper lip, but it's okay to be fragile.... You've got to take very small steps, and sometimes you won't know where to go next because you've lost yourself". She added: "With divorce, you go through massive grief—it is a death of a relationship, so it's utterly bewildering. Your identity, everything, changes".

Since 2018, Bonham Carter has been in a relationship with art historian Rye Dag Holmboe. Holmboe is 21 years her junior. Regarding their age gap, Bonham Carter told The Times in 2019: "Everybody ages at a different rate. My boyfriend is unbelievably mature. He's an old soul in a young body, what more could I want? People are slightly frightened of older women, but he isn't. Women can be very powerful when they're older".

Media image
Bonham Carter is known for her unconventional and eccentric sense of fashion. British Vogue described her dark style in clothing and acting as "quirky and irreverent". Vanity Fair named her on its 2010 Best-Dressed List and she was selected by Marc Jacobs to be the face of his Autumn/Winter 2011 advertising campaign. She has cited Vivienne Westwood and Marie Antoinette as her main style influences.

In May 2021, Bonham Carter featured in a commercial for British furniture retailer Sofology, taking viewers through the quirks and stylistic flourishes of her home. In 2021, she wrote an article for Harper's Bazaar on the influence of Lewis Carroll's Alice's Adventures in Wonderland on her life since she first read the book as a child: "As far back as I can remember, I’ve been a wannabe Alice", adding, "everywhere I look at home, every view has some reference to Alice: frog footman candlesticks, teacup constructions, a teapot lamp, a chessboard teapot, an oversized pocket watch, undersized doors, bunnies, internal windows that look like mirrors, and mirrors that look like windows".

Ancestry

Paternal

Bonham Carter's paternal grandparents were British Liberal politicians Sir Maurice Bonham-Carter and Lady Violet Bonham Carter. Helena is descended on her father's side from John Bonham Carter, Member of Parliament for Portsmouth. Helena's paternal great-grandfather was H. H. Asquith, 1st Earl of Oxford and Asquith and Prime Minister of Britain 1908–1916. She is the great-niece of Asquith's son, Anthony Asquith, English director of such films as Carrington V.C. and The Importance of Being Earnest, and a first cousin of the economist Adam Ridley and of politician Jane Bonham Carter.

Bonham Carter is a distant cousin of actor Crispin Bonham-Carter. Her other prominent distant relatives include Lothian Bonham Carter, who played first-class cricket for Hampshire, his son, Vice Admiral Sir Stuart Bonham Carter, who served in the Royal Navy in both world wars, and pioneering English nurse Florence Nightingale.

Maternal

Her maternal grandfather, Spanish diplomat Eduardo Propper de Callejón, saved thousands of Jews from the Holocaust during the Second World War, for which he was recognised as Righteous Among the Nations, and posthumously received the Courage to Care Award from the Anti-Defamation League. His own father was a Bohemian Jew, and his wife, Helena's grandmother, was a Jewish convert to Catholicism. He later served as Minister-Counselor at the Spanish Embassy in Washington, D.C.

Her maternal grandmother, Baroness Hélène Fould-Springer, was from an upper-class Jewish family; she was the daughter of Baron Eugène Fould-Springer (a French banker descended from the Ephrussi family and the Fould dynasty) and Marie-Cécile von Springer (whose father was Austrian-born industrialist Baron Gustav von Springer, and whose mother was from the de Koenigswarter family). Hélène Fould-Springer converted to Catholicism after the Second World War. Hélène's sister was the French philanthropist Liliane de Rothschild (1916–2003), the wife of Baron Élie de Rothschild, of the prominent Rothschild family (who had also married within the von Springer family in the 19th century); Liliane's other sister, Therese Fould-Springer, was the mother of British writer David Pryce-Jones.

Acting credits

Accolades and honours

Bonham Carter has been the recipient of a BAFTA Award, a Critics' Choice Movie Award, an International Emmy Award and three Screen Actors Guild Awards, as well as receiving further nominations for two Academy Awards, nine Golden Globe Awards and five Primetime Emmy Awards. She has received other prestigious awards such as a Los Angeles Film Critics Association Award and two National Board of Review awards.

Bonham Carter was made a CBE in the 2012 New Year Honours list for services to drama, and Prime Minister David Cameron announced that she had been appointed to Britain's new national Holocaust Commission in January 2014.

See also
List of British actors
List of British Academy Award nominees and winners
List of Jewish Academy Award winners and nominees
List of actors with Academy Award nominations
List of actors with two or more Academy Award nominations in acting categories

References

External links

 
 
 
 
 
 

1966 births
Actresses from London
Asquith family
Audiobook narrators
People from Islington (district)
Best Supporting Actress BAFTA Award winners
Best Actress Genie and Canadian Screen Award winners
Helena
Commanders of the Order of the British Empire
English film actresses
English people of Austrian-Jewish descent
English people of Czech-Jewish descent
English people of German-Jewish descent
English people of Spanish descent
English radio actresses
English stage actresses
English television actresses
English voice actresses
20th-century English actresses
21st-century English actresses
International Emmy Award for Best Actress winners
Living people
Outstanding Performance by a Cast in a Motion Picture Screen Actors Guild Award winners
People educated at South Hampstead High School
People educated at Westminster School, London
People from Golders Green
People from Sutton Courtenay
Fould family
British people of French-Jewish descent